Kévin Le Bras (born 11 February 1991) is a French footballer who currently plays for Japanese side Shibuya City.

Club career
Having started his career with Chamois Niortais, Le Bras went on to feature for the reserve teams of Angers and Vannes, before making his professional debut in Ligue 2 for the latter in 2011. 

In 2013, he moved to the United States to enrol at the Coastal Carolina University. While there, he featured regularly for the university's soccer team, the Coastal Carolina Chanticleers. While in his second year at university, Le Bras featured for the semi-professional PDL side SW Florida Adrenaline, scoring four goals in eleven appearances.

After graduating, Le Bras moved to Canada, joining PLSQ side Mont-Royal, where he made five appearances in the 2016 season.

Career statistics

Club
.

Notes

References

External links
Kévin Le Bras at the Coastal Carolina University

1991 births
Living people
People from Niort
Coastal Carolina University alumni
French footballers
Association football midfielders
Association football forwards
Ligue 2 players
USL League Two players
Chamois Niortais F.C. players
Angers SCO players
Vannes OC players
Coastal Carolina Chanticleers men's soccer players
SW Florida Adrenaline players
French expatriate footballers
French expatriate sportspeople in the United States
Expatriate soccer players in the United States
French expatriate sportspeople in Canada
Expatriate soccer players in Canada
French expatriate sportspeople in Japan
Expatriate footballers in Japan
Sportspeople from Deux-Sèvres
Footballers from Nouvelle-Aquitaine